Sām, also (sam) transliterated Saam, is a mythical hero of ancient Persia, and an important character in the Shahnameh epic. He was the son of Nariman, grandson of Garshasp and father to Zāl. He was Iran's champion during the rule of Fereydun, Manuchehr and Nowzar. He was appointed by Manuchehr to rule Zabulistan (Sistan), and then Mazandaran. After Manuchehr, because of Nowzar's corrupted and failed rulership, Iranian champions asked Sām to rule Iran. Sām didn't accept, he supported Nowzar and advised him to follow Fereydun and Manuchehr. Sām returned to Mazandaran, and died soon after that. Afrasiab then attacked Zabulistan.

In Persian, based on the Dehkhoda Dictionary, Sām or Saam means Fire.

References

External links
A king's book of kings: the Shah-nameh of Shah Tahmasp, an exhibition catalog from The Metropolitan Museum of Art (fully available online as PDF), which contains material on Sam

Kayanians
Shahnameh characters